The Tomb of Zechariah is an ancient stone monument in Jerusalem that is considered in Jewish tradition to be the tomb of Zechariah ben Jehoiada. It is a few meters from the Tomb of Absalom and adjacent to the Tomb of Benei Hezir.

Architectural description
The monument is a monolith—it is completely carved out of the solid rock The lowest part of the monument is a crepidoma, a base made of three steps. Above it there is a stylobate, upon which there is a decoration of two ionic columns between two half ionic columns and at the corners there are two pilasters. The capitals are of the Ionic order and are decorated with the egg-and-dart decoration. The upper part of the monument is an Egyptian-style cornice upon which sits a pyramid. The fine masonry and decoration that is visible on the western side, the facade, is only the western side. On the other sides of the tomb, the work is extremely rough and unfinished; it seems as if the work was stopped before the artists could finish the job.

Identification

Traditional identification
According to a Jewish tradition, which is first suggested by the 1215 AD writings of Menahem haHebroni, this is the tomb of the priest Zechariah Ben Jehoiada, a figure that the Book of Chronicles records to have been stoned:
And the Spirit of God came upon Zechariah the son of Jehoiada the priest, which stood above the people, and said unto them, Thus saith God, Why transgress ye the commandments of the Lord, that ye cannot prosper? because ye have forsaken the Lord, he hath also forsaken you. And they conspired against him, and stoned him with stones at the commandment of the king in the court of the house of the Lord

Scientific identification and dating
The style of the construction, which includes Hellenistic details such as Ionic columns, is similar to that of the Tomb of Benei Hezir, and several authors think that they are near-contemporary with one another; scholars specialising in funerary practices and monuments have ascribed a first-century AD date to the tomb. It has been proposed that the Tomb of Zechariah is actually the nefesh (a Jewish funerary monument similar to the Greek stele) for the Tomb of Benei Hezir, which is accessed from a rock-cut passage adjacent to the monument, and which states that it has an adjacent magnificent structure, an item not otherwise identified.

See also
Rock-cut tombs in ancient Israel

References

Archaeological sites in Jerusalem
Jewish mausoleums
Z
Mount of Olives
Rock-cut tombs
Tombs in Israel